The 1993–94 season was Dynamo Dresden's third season in the Bundesliga. They finished in 13th place, to date their best performance since German reunification. After a slow start, they went on a 10 match unbeaten run during the middle of the season, and won three of their last five games to finish well clear of the relegation zone. Dynamo were masters of the 1–0 win, thanks in part to loan signing Marek Penksa (all three of his goals were winners in such matches), and top scorer Olaf Marschall, who'd been signed from Admira Wacker during pre-season.

Dynamo also achieved their best ever result in the DFB-Pokal, beating Bayern Munich and Bayer Leverkusen before bowing out to Werder Bremen in the semi-final.

Squad

Results

Bundesliga

DFB-Pokal

Transfers

External links
Season details at fussballdaten 

Dynamo Dresden seasons
Dynamo Dresden